Marvin Burke, (March 15, 1918 – February 23, 1994) was a NASCAR driver from Pittsburg, California. He ran one Grand National Series race in his career, which he won.  His starting position in the thirty-two car field in the 1951 race at Oakland is unknown. Burke drove to the front early and led 156 laps en route to his first career victory in his first career start. Burke never raced again, making him the only driver in Cup history to win in his only career start.

He attempted to qualify for the 1950 Indianapolis 500 but failed to make the grid.

Motorsports career results

Complete Formula One World Championship results
(key)

NASCAR
(key) (Bold – Pole position awarded by qualifying time. Italics – Pole position earned by points standings or practice time. * – Most laps led.)

Grand National Series

References

External links
 

1918 births
1994 deaths
NASCAR drivers
Racing drivers from California
People from Pittsburg, California
Sportspeople from the San Francisco Bay Area